William F. Lawhead is an American philosopher.  

Lawhead is a Professor Emeritus of Philosophy at University of Mississippi having taught there since 1970 and served as the Chair of Department of Philosophy and Religion between 2005 and 2012. His main research interest has been in the history of philosophy.

Selected publications 
 Lawhead, W. F. (1999). The philosophical journey: an interactive approach. Mountain View, Calif, Mayfield Pub. (2014 McGraw-Hill, 6th Edition)
 Lawhead, W. F. (1995). The voyage of discovery: A history of Western philosophy. Wadsworth Publishing Company.

References 

Year of birth missing (living people)
Living people
20th-century American philosophers
University of Mississippi faculty